Angel's trumpet (also Angel's-trumpet and Angel's-trumpets) may refer to:

 two closely related genera of poisonous flowering plants in the family Solanaceae:
 Brugmansia, woody plants with pendulous flowers
 Datura, herbaceous plants with erect flowers
 Datura ferox, a widely naturalized species of Datura with strong spines
 Maurandya barclayana, an ornamental flowering plant in the family Plantaginaceae

See also
 Trumpet flower, other plants with trumpet-like flowers